The following is a list of highest waterfalls in Odisha. It is based on data from World Waterfall Database.

List

References

Odisha
waterfalls
 
Waterfalls, Odisha